The House of Piast was the first historical ruling dynasty of Poland. The first documented Polish monarch was Duke Mieszko I (c. 930–992). The Piasts' royal rule in Poland ended in 1370 with the death of king Casimir III the Great.

Branches of the Piast dynasty continued to rule in the Duchy of Masovia and in the Duchies of Silesia until the last male Silesian Piast died in 1675. The Piasts intermarried with several noble lines of Europe, and possessed numerous titles, some within the Holy Roman Empire. The Jagiellonian kings after John I Albert were also descended in the female line from Casimir III's daughter.

Origin of the name 
The early dukes and kings of Poland are said to have regarded themselves as descendants of the semi-legendary Piast the Wheelwright (Piast Kołodziej), first mentioned in the Cronicae et gesta ducum sive principum Polonorum (Chronicles and deeds of the dukes or princes of the Poles), written c. 1113 by Gallus Anonymus. However, the term "Piast Dynasty" was not applied until the 17th century. In a historical work the expression Piast dynasty was introduced by the Polish historian Adam Naruszewicz, it is not documented in contemporary sources.

History  

The first "Piasts", probably of Polan descent, appeared around 940 in the territory of Greater Poland at the stronghold of Giecz. Shortly afterwards they relocated their residence to Gniezno, where Prince Mieszko I ruled over the Civitas Schinesghe from about 960. The Piasts temporarily also ruled over Pomerania, Bohemia and the Lusatias, as well as Ruthenia, and the Hungarian Spiš region in present-day Slovakia. The ruler bore the title of a duke or a king, depending on their position of power.

The Polish monarchy had to deal with the expansionist policies of the Holy Roman Empire in the west, resulting in a chequered co-existence, with Piast rulers like Mieszko I, Casimir I the Restorer or Władysław I Herman trying to protect the Polish state by treaties, oath of allegiances and marriage alliances with the Imperial Ottonian and Salian dynasties. The Bohemian Přemyslid dynasty, the Hungarian Arpads and their Anjou successors, the Kievan Rus', later also the State of the Teutonic Order and the Grand Duchy of Lithuania were mighty neighbours.

The Piast position was decisively enfeebled by an era of fragmentation following the 1138 Testament of Bolesław III Wrymouth. For nearly 150 years, the Polish state shattered into several duchies, with the Piast duke against the formally valid principle of agnatic seniority fighting for the throne at Kraków, the capital of the Lesser Polish Seniorate Province. Numerous dukes like Mieszko III the Old, Władysław III Spindleshanks or Leszek I the White were crowned, only to be overthrown shortly afterwards. The senior branch of the Silesian Piasts, descendants of Bolesław III Wrymouth's eldest son Duke Władysław II the Exile, went separate ways and since the 14th century were vassals of the Bohemian Crown.

After the Polish royal line and Piast junior branch had died out in 1370, the Polish crown fell to the Anjou king Louis I of Hungary, son of late King Casimir's sister Elizabeth Piast. The Masovian branch of the Piasts became extinct with the death of Duke Janusz III in 1526. The last ruling duke of the Silesian Piasts was George William of Legnica who died in 1675. His uncle Count August of Legnica, the last male Piast, died in 1679. The last legitimate heir, Duchess Karolina of Legnica-Brieg died in 1707 and is buried in Trzebnica Abbey. Nevertheless, numerous families, like the illegitimate descendants of the Silesian duke Adam Wenceslaus of Cieszyn (1574–1617), link their genealogy to the dynasty.

Coat of arms

About 1295, Przemysł II used a coat of arms with a white eagle – a symbol later referred to as the Piast coat of arms or as the Piast Eagle.
The Silesian Piasts in the 14th century used an eagle modified by a crescent, which became the coat of arms of the Duchy of Silesia.

Piast rulers
Piast kings and rulers of Poland appear in list form in the following table. For a list of all rulers, see List of Polish monarchs.

Legendary dukes of the Polans

Dukes and Kings of Poland

High Dukes of Poland (Fragmentation of the Kingdom)

Kings of Poland (Reunification attempts)

Kings of Poland (Reunited Kingdom)

Female Piasts

Queen consorts

 Świętosława, supposed daughter of Mieszko I of Poland, Queen consort of Denmark, Norway, Sweden and England, mother of Cnut the Great, King of all England, Denmark and Norway
 Świętosława of Poland, daughter of Casimir I the Restorer, Queen consort of Bohemia
 Richeza of Poland, Queen of Sweden, daughter of Bolesław III Wrymouth, Queen consort of Sweden, mother of Canute V of Denmark, King of Denmark and Sophia of Minsk, Queen consort of Denmark
 Richeza of Poland, Queen of Castile, daughter of Władysław II the Exile, Queen consort of León and Galicia, Queen consort of Castile, Empress of All Spains
 Salomea of Poland, daughter of Leszek I the White, Queen consort of Halych
 Fenenna of Kuyavia, daughter of Ziemomysł of Kuyavia, Queen consort of Hungary
 Elizabeth Richeza of Poland, daughter of Przemysł II, Queen consort of Poland and Bohemia
 Viola of Cieszyn, daughter of Mieszko I, Duke of Cieszyn, Queen consort of Hungary, Bohemia and Poland
 Maria of Bytom, daughter of Casimir of Bytom, Queen consort of Hungary
 Beatrice of Silesia, daughter of Bolko I the Strict, Queen of the Romans
 Hedwig of Kalisz, daughter of Bolesław the Pious, Queen consort of Poland, mother of Casimir III the Great King of Poland and Elizabeth of Poland Queen consort of Hungary
 Elizabeth of Poland, daughter of Władysław I the Elbow-high, Queen consort of Hungary, mother of Louis I, King of Poland, Hungary and Croatia and Charles I of Hungary, King of Hungary and Croatia
 Anna of Świdnica, daughter of Henry II, Duke of Świdnica, Queen consort of Germany, of Bohemia and Holy Roman Empress, mother of Wenceslaus IV of Bohemia, King of the Romans and of Bohemia
 Hedwig of Sagan, daughter of Henry V of Iron, Queen consort of Poland

Priesthood

Archbishops
 Bolesław of Toszek – Archbishop of Esztergom
 Władysław of Wroclaw – Archbishop of Salzburg

Bishops

 Jarosław of Opole – Bishop of Wrocław
 Mieszko of Bytom – Bishop of Nitra and of Veszprém
 Henry of Masovia – Bishop of Płock
 Jan Kropidło – Bishop of Poznań, Włocławek, Kamień and Chełmno, Archbishop of Gniezno (only formally)
 Wenceslaus II of Legnica – Bishop of Lebus and of Wrocław
 Henry VIII of Legnica – Bishop of Wrocław
 Konrad IV the Older – Bishop of Wrocław
 Alexander of Masovia – Bishop of Trento
 Casimir III of Płock – Bishop of Płock

Family tree of Piasts

See also 

Kings of Poland family tree
List of Polish rulers
Dukes of Silesia
Silesian Piasts
Dukes of Masovia
Dukes of Greater Poland
Dukes of Teschen
Dukes of Leczyca
Dukes of Sieradz
:Category:House of Piast
Wawel Castle
Kingdom of Galicia–Volhynia
 Duchy of Bohemia
 King of Poland
 King of Rus'
 Duke of the Polans
 Duke of Poland
 Duke of Krakow
 Duke of Kuyavia
 Duke of Sandomierz
 Duke of Sieradz-Łęczyca
 Duke of Bohemia

References

External links
 Dukes of Kraków, Princes of Poland, Collier's

 
History of Poland during the Piast dynasty
History of Silesia